This is a list of Hungarian football transfers in the summer transfer window 2022 by club.

Nemzeti Bajnokság I

Debrecen

In:

Out:

Fehérvár

In:

Out:

Ferencváros

In:

Out:

Honvéd

In:

Out:

Kecskemét

In:

Out:

Kisvárda

In:

Out:

Mezőkövesd

In:

Out:

Paks

In:

Out:

Puskás Akadémia

In:

Out:

Újpest

In:

Out:

Zalaegerszeg

In:

Out:

References

External links
 Official site of the Hungarian Football Association
 Official site of the Nemzeti Bajnokság I

Hungarian
2022
Transfers